Parabon NanoLabs, Inc. is a company based in Reston, Virginia, that develops nanopharmaceuticals and provides DNA phenotyping services for law enforcement organizations.

History
Parabon NanoLabs, a subsidiary of Parabon Computation, a computing software provider, was founded in 2008 by Steven Armentrout, Michael Norton and Christopher Dwyer.  In 2018 Armentrout was the chief executive officer and President of Parabon Computation. Parabon NanoLabs has developed oncology therapeutics and synthetic vaccines using nanotechnology and DNA phenotyping.

Products

inSēquio Design Studio 
Together with the Edgewood Chemical Biological Center, the United States Army Research Office and the  National Science Foundation as part of a project in the Federal Small Business Innovation Research program, Parabon developed a computer aided design software called inSēquio Design Studio for nanoengineering DNA constructs.  This software was used to design and develop synthetic vaccines.

Snapshot
Snapshot DNA Phenotyping Service is the name of a DNA phenotyping tool developed by Parabon NanoLabs which creates composite face imaging sketches based on DNA samples. The algorithms used to make the composites are not open source, however, which has attracted criticism from members of the scientific community. Moses Schanfield, professor of forensic sciences at George Washington University, criticized the lack of any peer review, noting that there is no publicly available performance record for the product. In a 2016 article the American Civil Liberties Union recommended only using genetic phenotyping "...where the link between genes and external characteristics is based on well-proven, peer-reviewed, widely accepted science, such as is apparently now the case with hair and eye color." Skin color predictions have been reported to be somewhat reliable but not predictions of the shape of the face.  North Carolina detectives felt Parabon's Snapshot DNA Phenotyping Service had been helpful in identifying Jose Alvarez, Jr. in 2015 as the killer of Troy and LaDonna French in 2012. Privacy restrictions in 2019 on the use of GEDmatch for genetic genealogy may make DNA phenotyping more common. Illumina, Inc. and Identitas AG are reported to offer similar DNA phenotyping services.  The United States Department of Defense provided approximately $2,000,000 in development financing for Snapshot.

Keystone
Parabon NanoLabs was awarded a two-year contract by the United States Department of Defense to develop a software platform dubbed 'Keystone' for the forensic analysis of DNA evidence.

Genetic genealogy
In May 2018 Parabon NanoLabs appointed genealogist CeCe Moore as head of their genetic genealogy unit with three genealogists working for her.

In cooperation with American law enforcement, Parabon uploaded DNA evidence from crime scenes to GEDmatch in an attempt to identify perpetrators.

In November 2018 Parabon said they were working on 200 cases, 55% had produced leads and in May 2019 they said were solving cold cases at the rate of one a week.

In May 2019, GEDmatch required people who had uploaded their DNA to its site to specifically opt in to allow law enforcement agencies to access their information. This change in privacy policy was forecast to make it much more difficult in the future for law enforcement agencies and Parabon to identify suspects and solve cold cases using genetic genealogy.

According to an article published by Los Angeles Times in November 2019, "[CeCe] Moore said Parabon has opened about 300 DNA searches and that the lab has solved almost 100 cases — though arrests have not yet been made in several dozen of those cases." In May 2020 it was reported that Parabon had participated in nearly 500 cases with 109 suspect positive identifications.

In December 2019, it was announced that GEDmatch was sold to forensic, for-profit, DNA analysis company Verogen, whose CEO Brett Williams vowed to make the database safer for its customers, including fighting search warrants.

In a May 2020 interview with Scott Fisher of the podcast Extreme Genes, Moore revealed that in her capacity as the genetic genealogy lead, she no longer uses GEDmatch exclusively because of the decline of profiles available to law enforcement. Moore stated, "So, it would be better obviously, if we still had access to the full [GEDmatch] database, that million plus profiles, but it hasn’t stopped us. Also, we are using Family Tree DNA more and more all the time. Parabon is not able to upload directly but the agencies we work with can get the raw data from us and upload it to Family Tree DNA and then come back with that login information for us. So, we’re also helping to solve some cases with Family Tree DNA matches now. And as you know, theirs is the opt-out situation where you’re automatically opted in if you’re a US customer, unless you choose to opt out." This restricted direct-access limitation may be due to the fact that FamilyTreeDNA has their own genetic genealogy consultant, Barbara Rae-Venter, who solved the Golden State Killer cold case in May 2018.

On 26 May 2020, the ABC television network premiered The Genetic Detective, featuring Parabon's Moore, Steven Armentrout, Ph.D., and Ellen McRae Greytak, Ph.D. The hour-long episodes feature cases that Moore's genetic genealogy team has worked on since she started with Parabon.

The following list of case results may offer an overview of Parabon's increasing activity.

Case results: To trial
The following cases include suspects who were identified and then arrested for the indicated offenses. All suspects are considered innocent until proven guilty in a court of law. Convictions are highlighted in green.

Case results: Confessions and guilty pleas
In the following cases, the suspect arrested for the offense subsequently confessed and was sentenced without going to trial.

Case results: Identification of deceased primary suspects
In these cases, the offender was identified, but died without ever being brought to justice. Although the percentage accuracy in the identification of these primary suspects is extremely high, the cases remain open because there can be no convictions.

Case results: Identification of John and Jane Does
Unidentified remains of deceased individuals are given the names Jane Doe for females and John Doe for males. In cases where homicide is suspected, the identification of the remains is the first step in finding the deceased's killer. Not all Does are victims of homicide, however.

References

External links 
 Parabon Snapshots and advanced DNA analysis web page
 Subjects identified, People of interest and Unidentified remains followed by Parabon

2008 establishments in Virginia
Companies based in Reston, Virginia
Forensics organizations
American companies established in 2008
Pharmaceutical companies established in 2008
DNA profiling techniques